Akımlı is a village in the Yedisu District, Bingöl Province, Turkey. The village is populated by Kurds and had a population of 3 in 2021.

The hamlet of Sarıçubuk is attached to the village.

References 

Villages in Yedisu District
Kurdish settlements in Bingöl Province